Monrovia is the capital city of the West African country of Liberia.

Monrovia may also refer to:

Places

Liberia
 Greater Monrovia District, one of four districts located in Montserrado County, Liberia

United States
 Monrovia, Alabama
 Monrovia, California
 Monrovia, Indiana
 Monrovia, Kansas
 Monrovia, Maryland
 Monrovia station, a light rail station in Los Angeles

Other uses
 SS Monrovia, a Liberian cargo ship in service 1954-59
 Monrovia Unified School District, a school district in Los Angeles County, California
 Monrovia High School, in Monrovia, California
 Monrovia Handicap, an American Thoroughbred horse race

See also